Abdollah Shahbazi (born 1955 in Shiraz, Iran) is an Iranian historian.

Background 
Shahbazi graduated from the department of Social Sciences at The University of Tehran and became active in areas of political and historical research during the 1980s. He founded The Political Studies and Research Institute  in 1988, and for a decade was in charge of its research activities. In 1995, he reorganized the document center of Iran's "Bonyad"  into a professional historical institute, The Institute for Iranian Contemporary Historical Studies.

Shahbazi's father, Habibollah Khan Shahbazi, was the leader of the Sorkhi tribes of Kuhmarre Sorkhi region of Fars Province and led Iran's 1962-1963 tribal rebellion against the Pahlavi dynasty. He was executed together with other dignitaries of southern Iranian Tribes on October 5, 1964.

Publications 
Shahbazi has published numerous books and articles about Iranian pastoral nomads (Ilat va Ashayer), contemporary history of Iran and political thought.

Most famous are:

The Forgotten Tribe: A Study of the Sorkhi Tribe of Fars Province (1987).
An Introduction to the Study of Nomads of Persia (1990).
The Rise and Fall of the Pahlavi Dynasty (1991). The first volume of this two-volume set contains the controversial memoirs of General Hossein Fardoust, head of Mohammad Reza Shah's Special Intelligence Office. The second volume is a collection of monographs by Shahbazi regarding historical events and important characters of Pahlavi era based on the period's classified documents. The Rise and Fall of the Pahlavi Dynasty has been a bestseller in Iran and many films and TV series have been made based on it.
Jewish and Parsi Plutocrats: British Imperialism and Iran (1999-2004) in 5 volumes. By "Parsi" Shahbazi means the wealthy Parsi (Zoroastrian) families of Bombay and western India during the 19th and 20th centuries.

He compiled and edited the memoirs of the leaders of The Tudeh Party of Iran (Iranian Communist Party), Noureddin Kianouri (1992) and Iraj Eskandari (1993).

External links
 Official website
 

People from Shiraz
1955 births
Living people
Tudeh Party of Iran members
20th-century Iranian historians
University of Tehran alumni
Faculty of Social Sciences of the University of Tehran alumni
21st-century Iranian historians